Edward Llewellyn may refer to:

Edward Llewellyn, Baron Llewellyn of Steep (born 1965), former Downing Street Chief of Staff
Edward Llewellyn-Thomas (1917–1984), English scientist, professor and (under Edward Llewellyn) science-fiction author
Edward Llewellyn (trumpeter) (1879–1936), American trumpet player
Ted Llewellyn (1909–2002), Australian rules footballer

See also
Llewellyn (surname)